Andrew Maclean Pollock (11 June 1914 – 19 December 1969) was a Scottish-born South African cricketer, who played a small number of first-class matches for Orange Free State. A left-handed bat and wicketkeeper, he was the father of Peter Pollock and Graeme Pollock, the grandfather of Shaun, Anthony and Andrew Graeme Pollock, and the brother in law of Robert Howden.

References

External links 

1914 births
1969 deaths
South African cricketers
Free State cricketers
Scottish emigrants to South Africa